

History
ECAC 2 began holding a conference tournament for the 1965–66 season with four teams invited to participate. Even after 5 teams left in 1971 to form ECAC 3 the league's membership had risen from 15 to 24 teams in the interim and the championship was expanded to eight. By 1977–78 ECAC 2 has 32 member schools and rather than institute a single 16-team tournament the league decided to hold one 8-team tournament for each of its two divisions (East and West). This was partly done to guarantee the two tournament champions automatic bids to the NCAA Tournament which began play the same year. Some schools, however, either had policies that barred them from appearing in national tournaments or were ineligible to appear in a Division II tournament due to being primarily a Division I or Division III school. This arrangement held for 6 years before the entire Division II level of college hockey collapsed after 1983–84 and ECAC 2 was formally split into two separate conferences the following season.

1966

Note: * denotes overtime period(s)

1967

Note: * denotes overtime period(s)

1968

Note: * denotes overtime period(s)

1969

Note: * denotes overtime period(s)

1970

Note: * denotes overtime period(s)

1971

Note: * denotes overtime period(s)

1972

Note: * denotes overtime period(s)

1973

Note: * denotes overtime period(s)

1974

Note: * denotes overtime period(s)

1975

Note: * denotes overtime period(s)

1976

Note: * denotes overtime period(s)

1977

Note: * denotes overtime period(s)

1978

East

West

Note: * denotes overtime period(s)

1979

East

West

Note: * denotes overtime period(s)

1980

East

West

Note: * denotes overtime period(s)

1981

East

West

Note: * denotes overtime period(s)

1982

East

West

Note: * denotes overtime period(s)

1983

East

West

Note: * denotes overtime period(s)

1984

East

West

Note: * denotes overtime period(s)

Championships

See also
NEHC Men's Tournament
ECAC West Men's Tournament

References

Further reading

Ice hockey articles needing expert attention
Ice hockey
Recurring sporting events established in 1966
Recurring sporting events disestablished in 1984